U.S. Città di Palermo played the season 2014–15 in the Serie A league and Coppa Italia.

Season overview

After completing the 2013–14 Serie B season in first place, Giuseppe Iachini was confirmed as head coach. On the other hand, Giorgio Perinetti left the club after chairman Maurizio Zamparini hired Franco Ceravolo as new director of football. Igor Budan will also leave his role as team manager to fulfil a career as director of football himself. This was also followed by Abel Hernández's selection to the Uruguay squad for the 2014 FIFA World Cup, making him the only Palermo player to appear in the competition. Hernández himself was subsequently sold to Hull in what appeared one of the main transfer moves of the season, together with the sale of Kyle Lafferty to Norwich and the signing of two players scouted from the 2014 FIFA World Cup, Sol Bamba and Giancarlo González.

On its first official game, Palermo lost 0–3 at home to Serie B club Modena in the 2014–15 Coppa Italia third round, thus being immediately eliminated from the competition. A number of dismal results left the Rosanero winless at the bottom of the league after six games in the season increased pressure on Iachini, whose coaching staff was successively extended in early October with the hiring of Fabio Viviani. This was followed by the dismissal of Franco Ceravolo and his replacement with youth system head Dario Baccin.

Club

Managerial staff

Coaching staff

Youth system

Players

Squad information

Transfers

Summer 2014

In

Out

On loan

Winter 2014–15

In

Out

On loan

Pre-season and friendlies

Competitions

Serie A

League table

Results summary

Results by round

Matches

Coppa Italia

Statistics

Appearances and goals
As of 30 May 2015

|-
! colspan=10 style="background:#DCDCDC; text-align:center"| Goalkeepers

|-
! colspan=10 style="background:#DCDCDC; text-align:center"| Defenders

|-
! colspan=10 style="background:#DCDCDC; text-align:center"| Midfielders

|-
! colspan=10 style="background:#DCDCDC; text-align:center"| Forwards

|-
! colspan=10 style="background:#DCDCDC; text-align:center"| Players transferred out during the season

|}

Goalscorers
This includes all competitive matches.  The list is sorted by shirt number when total goals are equal.
{| class="wikitable sortable" style="font-size: 95%; text-align: center;"
|-
!width=15|
!width=15|
!width=15|
!width=15|
!width=150|Name
!width=80|Serie A
!width=80|Coppa Italia
!width=80|Total
|-
|1
|9
|FW
|
|Paulo Dybala
|13
|0
|13
|-
|2
|20
|MF
|
|Franco Vázquez
|10
|0
|10
|-
|-
|=
|27
|MF
|
|Luca Rigoni
|9
|0
|9
|-
|4
|99
|FW
|
|Andrea Belotti
|6
|0
|6
|-
|5
|18
|MF
|
|Ivaylo Chochev
|3
|0
|3
|-
|6
|8
|MF
|
|Édgar Barreto
|2
|0
|2
|-
|=
|21
|MF
|
|Robin Quaison
|2
|0
|2
|-
|=
|7
|DF
|
|Achraf Lazaar
|2
|0
|2
|-
|7
|89
|DF
|
|Michel Morganella
|1
|0
|1
|-
|=
|6
|DF
|
|Ezequiel Muñoz
|1
|0
|1
|-
|=
|12
|MF
|
|Giancarlo González
|1
|0
|1
|-

References

Palermo F.C. seasons
Palermo